Safety service (also: safety radiocommunication service or safety-of-life service) is – according to Article 1.59 of the International Telecommunication Union's (ITU) Radio Regulations (RR) – defined as «A radiocommunication service used permanently or temporarily for the safeguarding of human life and property.»

Few typical examples of safety services are as follows:
Aeronautical mobile service (article 1.32)
Aeronautical mobile (R)° service (article 1.33)
Aeronautical mobile-satellite service (article 1.35)
Aeronautical mobile-satellite (R)° service (article 1.36)
Radionavigation service (article 1.42)
 Radionavigation-satellite service (article 1.43)
 Maritime radionavigation service (article 1.44)
(R)° = abbreviation to route flights (route)Internal IP: 192.168.23.139 fe80::84ad:58ff:febe:c

See also
Radio station
Radiocommunication service

References 

 International Telecommunication Union (ITU)

Radiocommunication services ITU
Radio navigation
Air traffic control